Nizhnyaya Maza is a rural locality (a selo) in Verkhnemazovskoye Rural Settlement, Verkhnekhavsky District, Voronezh Oblast, Russia. The population was 89 as of 2010.

Geography 
Nizhnyaya Maza is located 29 km east of Verkhnyaya Khava (the district's administrative centre) by road. Nikolskoye 3-ye is the nearest rural locality.

References 

Rural localities in Verkhnekhavsky District